This is a list of musical compositions or pieces of music that have unusual time signatures. "Unusual" is here defined to be any time signature other than simple time signatures with top numerals of 2, 3, or 4 and bottom numerals of 2, 4, or 8, and compound time signatures with top numerals of 6, 9, or 12 and bottom numerals 4, 8, or 16.

The conventions of musical notation typically allow for more than one written representation of a particular piece. The chosen time signature largely depends upon musical context, personal taste of the composer or transcriber, and the graphic layout on the written page. Frequently, published editions were written in a specific time signature to visually signify the tempo for slow movements in symphonies, sonatas, and concerti.

A perfectly consistent unusual metrical pattern may be notated in a more familiar time signature that does not correspond to it. For example, the Passacaglia from Britten's opera Peter Grimes consists of variations over a recurring bass line eleven beats in length but is notated in ordinary  time, with each variation lasting  bars, and therefore commencing each time one crotchet earlier in the bar than the preceding one.

Upper number of 1

Enigma Variations by Edward Elgar, in Variation VII.
Entr'actes and Sappho Fragments by Harrison Birtwistle.
Leopardi Fragments by Peter Maxwell Davies.
Mixtur by Karlheinz Stockhausen.
Rhythmicana by Henry Cowell, for the entire first two movements.
String Quartet No. 2 by Easley Blackwood Jr.
Symphony No. 2 by Alexander Borodin. Movement II is in Prestissimo , except for the trio section, which is in Allegretto .

Appalachian Spring, by Aaron Copland. at the third bar of rehearsal 46 and the third bar of rehearsal 48.
Apaisement, Op. 13 No. 1, by Ernest Chausson.
Canon with Sustained Notes, No. 60 from Mikrokosmos by Béla Bartók, in one measure.
Decet for wind instruments, Op. 14, by George Enescu, at bar 240 of the third movement (fifth bar before rehearsal number 42).
Fünf Klavierstücke, Op. 23 by Arnold Schoenberg, at bar 9 of the second piece.
Káťa Kabanová, by Leoš Janáček, for some measures in Act III between rehearsal numbers 5 and 8.
La Langeur, from Le follie francaise ou les dominos from Pieces de Clavecin by Francois Couperin.
Mladi by Leoš Janáček, at measure 68 of the second movement.
 8 Nocturnes, FP 56 by Francis Poulenc, at bar 27 of No. 1.
 Piano Sonata, Op. 43, by Harry Farjeon for a few bars in the first movement.
 Piano Sonata No. 3, Op. 105, by Sigfrid Karg-Elert.
Piano Sonata No. 5, Op. 53, by Alexander Scriabin, at bars 251 to 262 (Presto giocoso).
Quartet, Op. 22, by Anton Webern, in many bars of the second movement.
Rapsodie nègre by Francis Poulenc, for some bars in the third movement, "Honoloulou".
String Quartet No. 1, by Béla Bartók, in bars 3, 10, and 22 of the third movement.
Symphony No. 1, by Edward Elgar, in the second movement.
Symphony No. 17 in G minor by Nikolay Myaskovsky, in many parts of the first movement.

Alcancías by Silvestre Revueltas, in the second movement, for some bars between rehearsal marks 24 and 32.
Carmina Burana by Carl Orff, in the movement Swaz hie gat umbe.
Clarinet Sonata by Andrew Violette, at measure 97 of the first movement.
Concerto for Piano and Wind Instruments by Igor Stravinsky, just before rehearsal mark 83.
"Etincelles," the first movement of Suite Bizarre by Joseph Achron.
 Fantasy on Themes from Mozart's Figaro and Don Giovanni, S. 697, by Franz Liszt and completed by Leslie Howard. Bar 431/427 is in  time.
Iberia by Isaac Albéniz, in the movement Jerez.
Lonely Child (1980) by Claude Vivier, at bar 56.
Mädchentotenlieder, by Bo Nilsson, in many bars.
Metastaseis, by Iannis Xenakis, in the first 103 bars.
Metropolis Part 1: The Miracle and the Sleeper, by Dream Theater, at the third bar of rehearsal R.
On an Overgrown Path, by Leoš Janáček, for some bars in the sixth, tenth, and eleventh movements.
Petrushka by Igor Stravinsky, for the bar before rehearsal 17.
Piano Concerto No. 2 by Sergei Prokofiev, in two measures in the second movement.
Piano Sonata no. 2 by Roger Sessions, at measure 178.
Piano Sonata No. 3 by Carlos Chávez, in six bars of the first movement.
Tzigane by Maurice Ravel, in four measures, the first of which is right before rehearsal 27.
Zipangu (1980) by Claude Vivier in several measures.

Alchymia by Thomas Adès has a measure of +.

 Amor dammi quel fazzolettino by Andrew Violette, for one measure in the left hand of the second piano part.

 Carmina Burana by Carl Orff, in the movement Fortune plango vulnera.
 Last Dance by Andrew Violette.
Lincolnshire Posy by Percy Grainger, in the fifth movement, "Lord Melbourne".
Lonely Child (1980) by Claude Vivier, in several measures.
Mädchentotenlieder, by Bo Nilsson, at bar 53.
A Nightmare to Remember, by Dream Theater, in bar 31.
On an Overgrown Path, by Leoš Janáček, for two bars in the third movement.
Piano Sonata No. 1 by Charles Wuorinen, at bar 84 of part 1.
Piano Sonata no. 2 by Roger Sessions, at bar 223.
Piano Sonata No. 3 by Carlos Chávez, at bar 165 of the second movement.
A próle do bébé, Book 2 by Heitor Villa-Lobos. The fifth piece, "O Cavalinho de páu" (The Little Wooden Horse), bar 68 is in  time.

Mädchentotenlieder, by Bo Nilsson, at bar 11.
Piano Sonata no. 2 by Roger Sessions, at measure 257.

Mädchentotenlieder, by Bo Nilsson, in bar 9.
 Piano Sonata No. 1 by Charles Wuorinen, in bar 43 of part 1.

Upper number of 2

Káťa Kabanová, by Leoš Janáček.
5 Motets by Peter Maxwell Davies.
Partita No. 6 in E minor, BWV 830, by Johann Sebastian Bach.
Piano Sonata No. 3 by Sigfrid Karg-Elert, in one measure.

Comme le vent, first of the Douze études dans toutes les tons mineurs, Op. 39, by Charles-Valentin Alkan.
 Requiem Canticles by Igor Stravinsky, for the last measure of the Prelude.
The Rite of Spring by Igor Stravinsky.  is used in the concluding "Sacrificial Dance".

 Sketch, Op. 1 No. 10, by Alexei Stanchinsky.

Upper number of 3

Chaconne in D major by Samuel Capricornus.
 5 Motets by Peter Maxwell Davies.
 "O Fortuna" from Carl Orff's Carmina Burana (first four bars).
 Passacaglia in D minor by Johann Philipp Krieger.
 Piano Sonata No. 3 by Sigfrid Karg-Elert, in one measure.
 Rosary Sonatas, by Heinrich Ignaz Franz Biber, for part of No. 11.
Symphony No. 3 by Camille Saint-Saëns, in two sections (a total of 22 bars) at the end of the finale.
Symphony No. 4 by Charles Ives.
 "Um Mitternacht" by Gustav Mahler (Rückert-Lieder No. 5). Bar 27 is marked "".

Abraham and Isaac by Igor Stravinsky.
 Apollo by Igor Stravinsky, near rehearsal mark 23.

 Cantata No. 1 by Anton Webern, in the second movement.
 Concerto for Piano and Wind Instruments by Igor Stravinsky, after rehearsal mark 39.
 Concerto for Two Pianos by Igor Stravinsky, in the second movement.
 Concerto in E-flat by Igor Stravinsky has a measure of + a few measures after rehearsal mark 4.
Donna Diana Overture, by Emil von Reznicek.
Mädchentotenlieder, by Bo Nilsson, at bar 114.
Piano Sonata No. 1 in C major, Op. 1, by Johannes Brahms. Movement II, bars 47–49 and 51–53.
Piano Sonata No. 1 by Charles Wuorinen, at measure 29 of part 1.
Requiem Canticles by Igor Stravinsky.
The Rite of Spring by Igor Stravinsky, in the concluding "Sacrificial Dance".
String Quartet, Op. 28, by Anton Webern in bars 40-41 and 44-51 of the third movement.
Symphonic Studies, Étude IX (first version) by Robert Schumann.
Toccata, Op. 10, by Niels Viggo Bentzon, in a single measure.
 Variations for piano, Op. 27, by Anton Webern, movement I.

Intrada, nebst burlesquer Suite, for two violins (the so-called "Gulliver Suite") by Georg Philipp Telemann. Movement II, "Lilliputsche Chaconne".
Mädchentotenlieder, by Bo Nilsson, at bar 3.
Piano Sonata No. 1 by Charles Wuorinen, at measure 13 of part 1.
Pribaoutki by Igor Stravinsky, for bar 15 of the fourth piece, "Starets i zayats".
String Quartet, Op. 28, by Anton Webern in bars 28-37 of the third movement.

Upper number of 4

5 Motets by Peter Maxwell Davies.

Abraham and Isaac by Igor Stravinsky.
 Le chant du rossignol by Igor Stravinsky, at the measure before rehearsal mark 37.
Homenaje a Federico García Lorca by Silvestre Revueltas, for the entire first movement, "Baile" (Dance), except for one free-rhythm bar at the beginning and two at the end.
Piano Sonata No. 1 in C major, Op. 1, by Johannes Brahms. Movement II, bars 46 and 50.
Piano Sonata No. 3 in F minor, Op. 5, by Johannes Brahms. Movement II, bars 37–66 and 77–90.
Pribaoutki by Igor Stravinsky, for bar 16 of the fourth piece, "Starets i zayats".
Requiem Canticles by Igor Stravinsky, for two measures near the end of the Prelude movement.
The Rite of Spring by Igor Stravinsky, in the concluding "Sacrificial Dance".
String Quartet, Op. 28, by Anton Webern, in bars 52 and 53 of the third movement.
Variations on a Theme by Robert Schumann, Op. 9, by Johannes Brahms. Variation XI.

Upper number of 5

Upper number of 6

Cantata No. 1 by Anton Webern, in the first movement.

 Carmina Burana by Carl Orff, in the movement Ave formossisima.
 Piano Sonata No. 1 by Charles Wuorinen, in its last two measures.

 Symphony No. 4 by Charles Ives, for bar 102 of the third movement.

 "Um Mitternacht" by Gustav Mahler (Rückert-Lieder No. 5). Bar 27 is marked "".

Piano Sonata No. 1 by Charles Wuorinen, at measure 162 in part 1 (written ).

Upper number of 7

Upper number of 8 

Note:  or  may refer to an evenly divided compound duple or quadruple meter. While this is arguably extremely common in music, the notations  and  themselves are not, so all divisions of this time signature are listed here

Carmina Burana by Carl Orff, in the movement Reie.

A Choral Fantasia, Op. 51, by Gustav Holst, for bars 36–69, 142–148, 173–178, and 191–198.
Agon by Igor Stravinsky, at measure 164.
"All You Need Is Love" by the Beatles.
Chaconne by Andrew Violette, at measures 55 and 109.
 "I Ejaculate Fire" by Dethklok.
 Lamentations and Consolations by Sergei Bortkiewicz, in some bars of Lamentation No. 1 and Consolation No. 4 (Sorrento).
 Lincoln, The Great Commoner by Charles Ives.
Mädchentotenlieder, by Bo Nilsson, at bar 73.
L'Oeuvre d'orgue by Jehan Alain, in the first movement of the Suite and in the third of the Trois Danses.
De Staat by Louis Andriessen.
String Quartet No. 2, Op. 36 (1945), by Benjamin Britten.
Study No. 22 by Charles Ives, in measures 3-4 and 18-19.
Symphony No. 3 by Peter Maxwell Davies.

Cantata No. 1 by Anton Webern, at measure 51 in the third movement.
 Concertino by Igor Stravinsky, at rehearsal mark 14.

Concerto for Orchestra by Béla Bartók.
Fancy Free by Leonard Bernstein.
36 Fugues, Op. 36 by Anton Reicha.
Mikrokosmos by Béla Bartók. 
No. 140, "Free Variations," in some places.
Music for Strings, Percussion, and Celesta by Béla Bartók. 
Movement I, bars 1, 3, 5, 7, 9, 11, 13, 15, 19, 22, 26–27, 29, 38–40, 46, 53, 69, 71, 73, 75, 83, and 85 are in 
Petrushka by Igor Stravinsky.
 Piano Sonata No. 2 ("The Airplane"), by George Antheil.
De Staat by Louis Andriessen.
Symphony No. 1 by Gustav Mahler.
Symphony No. 3 by Peter Maxwell Davies. Third movement has one bar of  before rehearsal X.
Threni by Igor Stravinsky.

Abraham and Isaac by Igor Stravinsky, at measure 159.
 Agon by Igor Stravinsky. Measure 423 is in parenthesized .
 Canticum Sacrum by Igor Stravinsky, at measures 71-72.

The Cry of Anubis, for tuba and orchestra by Harrison Birtwistle.
The Flood by Igor Stravinsky. Bars 406, 414, 422, 427, 432, 440, and 448 are in  time, all divided .
Histoire du soldat by Igor Stravinsky has one bar in  time, at the fourth bar following rehearsal 35, in the movement "Ragtime".
Requiem Canticles by Igor Stravinsky. The interlude has bar 156 in  time.

Upper number of 9 
Time signatures that group nine beats into  are very common in music.

Agon by Igor Stravinsky, at measure 167.
 Concertino by Igor Stravinsky, one measure after rehearsal mark 14 (subdivided ).

 "The Count of Tuscany" by Dream Theater.
 "I Wanna Be a Movie Star" by Bill Wurtz.
Lonely Child (1980) by Claude Vivier has  in measure 142.

"Apocalypse in " by Genesis.
"The Crunge" by Led Zeppelin.
Estancia by Alberto Ginastera.
Mikrokosmos by Béla Bartók
"VROOOM VROOOM" by King Crimson contains a few measures in  during the bridge.

Lonely Child (1980) by Claude Vivier has  in measures 70, 87, 97, etc.
Piano Sonata no. 2 by Roger Sessions, at measure 337 (grouped ).

Un Vitrail et des Oiseaux by Olivier Messiaen uses .

Upper number of 10

Concertino by Igor Stravinsky, two measures after rehearsal mark 14.
"Just Like You Imagined" by Nine Inch Nails.
Lonely Child (1980) by Claude Vivier has  in measure 141.
"Playing in the Band" by the Grateful Dead (notated as ).
 "Retreat!
String Quartet No. 2, Op. 36 (1945), by Benjamin Britten.
 "Testostyrannosaurus" by Hail the Sun, in some parts.
"Unisphere" (1964) by The Dave Brubeck Quartet.
"Wanderlove" by Mason Williams.
"Everything in its Right Place" by Radiohead.

3 Danses from L'Oeuvre d'orgue by Jehan Alain, in the second dance.
"Nostalgia" by Yanni.
Piano Sonata No. 1 by Charles Wuorinen, at measure 170 of part 2.
Piano Sonata No. 2 ("The Airplane"), by George Antheil.
Piano Sonata no. 2 by Roger Sessions, at measure 230.
Sketch, Op. 1 No. 7, by Alexei Stanchinsky.
Threni, id est Lamentationes Jeremiae Prophetae, by Igor Stravinsky. "Solacium", part 3 of "De Elegia Tertia".

Concerto for Piano, Clarinet, and String Quartet by Roy Harris.

 Étude, Op. 35, no. 12 in E major, for piano, by Charles-Valentin Alkan. (grouped as   )
 Etude No. 1 by Tigran Hamasyan.

Upper number of 11

"Awaken" by Yes (first section).
Concertino by Igor Stravinsky, just before rehearsal mark 15.
Concerto in E-flat by Igor Stravinsky, just before rehearsal mark 25.
"Crowned & Kissed" by Esperanza Spalding. The two-bar chorus groove is in  time.
"Eleven Four", by Paul Desmond and recorded by the Dave Brubeck Quartet.
In Nomine IX, for harpsichord, by John Bull. , though it is not notated as such, either in the original manuscript or the new edition.
 Mädchentotenlieder, by Bo Nilsson. Bar 74 is in  time.
 Requiem Canticles by Igor Stravinsky, in the first bar of the Libera Me.
The Rite of Spring by Igor Stravinsky.
"Testostyrannosaurus" by Hail the Sun, in some parts.
 "Whipping Post", by the Allman Brothers Band, begins with a two-bar  riff.

Bachianas Brasileiras No. 9, by Heitor Villa-Lobos.
"Blockhead", by Devo. The verses are in  time.
2 Canzonas with Dances, Op. 43, by Nikolai Medtner.
3 Danses from L'Oeuvre d'orgue by Jehan Alain, in the second dance.
"The Eleven" (1969) by the Grateful Dead.
 "Eleven" by Primus.
"Here Comes the Sun" (1969), written by the Beatles' George Harrison.
"In Re Con Moto Et Al" by Charles Ives uses .
 "Larks' Tongues in Aspic, Pt. 1", by King Crimson. The song shifts between these metres for the remainder of the song.
"Losing It" by Rush.
"Man-Erg" (1971), by Van der Graaf Generator.
Piano Sonata No. 2 in G major by Alexei Stanchinsky.
A próle do bébé No. 2, by Heitor Villa-Lobos.
"Puedo Escribir" by Sixpence None The Richer is in 
 "Serenade", a wedding recessional by Derek Bourgeois.
Sketch, Op. 1 No. 5, by Alexei Stanchinsky.
 "Skrting on the Surface" by the Smile.
 "Trapped in the Wake of a Dream" by Mudvayne (chorus in )
"Upstart" written by Don Ellis and performed by the Don Ellis Orchestra
"Where but for Caravan Would I?" by Caravan.

Concerto for Piano, Clarinet, and String Quartet by Roy Harris.

 Piano Sonata no. 2 by Roger Sessions, for some measures in the first movement.

Upper number of 12

Piano Sonata No. 1 by Charles Wuorinen, at measure 161 of part 1 (written ).

Piano Sonata No. 32 in C minor, Op. 111, by Ludwig van Beethoven. Movement II from bars 48 to 64.

Upper number of 13

"The Great Divide" by Don Ellis.
 "Rabbit" by This Town Needs Guns, in some sections.
 Requiem Canticles by Igor Stravinsky, in measure 276 (grouped )
De Staat by Louis Andriessen. Bars 356 and 517.
 "Starless" (1974), by King Crimson.
"World's Fair" (1964) by The Dave Brubeck Quartet.

"The Becoming" by Nine Inch Nails begins in this time signature.
 "Electric Sunrise" by Plini
 "I Will Be Absorbed", by Egg.
 "Lauft... Heisst Das Es Lauft Oder Es Kommt Bald..Lauft" by Faust.
"Odd Boy" by Mutant-Thoughts, in the verses.
A próle do bébé No. 2, by Heitor Villa-Lobos. A measure in the fourth movement, "O cachorrinho de borracha". Two measures in the ninth movement, "O lobozinho de vidro", are also in this signature.
The chorus of "ProzaKc Blues" by King Crimson in some measures.
 "Serenade", a wedding recessional by Derek Bourgeois, the middle section.
 "Skimbleshanks, The Railway Cat" from Andrew Lloyd Webber's musical Cats.
De Staat by Louis Andriessen. Bar 724.
"13th August" by FromUz.
"To Negate" by Tigran Hamasyan.
 "Turn It on Again" by Genesis. The verses and choruses.
 ”Jóga” (1997) by Björk (chorus only).

Piano Sonata no. 2 by Roger Sessions, at measure 154 of the first movement.

The Terminator main theme, by Brad Fiedel.

Upper number of 14

Polychromatics by Louis Gruenberg. No. 7, "Invocation," in one measure.

American Song Set by Andrew Violette, for two measures in one of the songs.

 Concerto for Piano, Clarinet, and String Quartet by Roy Harris.

Upper number of 15

"Chionoblepharou pater Aous" [Father of the bright-eyed Dawn], Hymn to the Sun, by Mesomedes of Crete (grouped )
 Concerto for Piano, Clarinet, and String Quartet by Roy Harris.
 Sections of "Endless Dream" by Yes.
 Passage of "Karn Evil 9", 1st Impression, Part 1 (1973), by Emerson, Lake and Palmer.
 "Limo Wreck" by Soundgarden.
"Perpetuum Mobile" by the Penguin Cafe Orchestra.
 "Tubular Bells" by Mike Oldfield.
 "The Eight Miracle" by Bob Curnow.

Concerto for Piano, Clarinet, and String Quartet by Roy Harris.
 Concerto rotondo per violoncello solo (2000) by Giovanni Sollima, movement 4, bars 1-17, divided .
Lonely Child (1980) by Claude Vivier has  in measure 104.
The Phantom of the Opera (1986) by Andrew Lloyd Webber: "Notes" and "Notes II"  each contain multiple sections, divided  
Piano Sonata no. 2 by Roger Sessions, at measure 100 of the first movement.
 Robert Browning Overture, by Charles Ives includes a measure.
 De Staat by Louis Andriessen.
 String Quartet No. 1 (1949), by Leon Kirchner includes measures.

Piano Sonata No. 1 by Charles Wuorinen, at measure 163 of part 1 (written ).

Upper number of 16

Concerto for Piano, Clarinet, and String Quartet by Roy Harris.

Upper number of 17

"Panda" by This Town Needs Guns, in some sections. It also includes other meters like .
 "Seven Teens", by Lionel Loueke.

"The Alien" by Dream Theater.
 The intro of "Changes" by Yes.
 "The Hole Pt. 1" by Noisia is described by the band as being "more or less" in this time signature.
 "Hollow" by Björk.
 "Moon" by Björk.
 "Trapped in the Wake of a Dream" by Mudvayne, verses

Concerto for Piano, Clarinet, and String Quartet by Roy Harris.

 Sections of the instrumental Discipline by King Crimson, among other signatures.
 Mladi by Leoš Janáček, in the second movement.
 Piano Sonata No. 2 by Andrew Violette.

Upper number of 18

"Birds of Fire" by Mahavishnu Orchestra. The guitar plays  while the drums play . The violin from time to time plays .
 3 Danses from L'Oeuvre d'orgue by Jehan Alain, in the first and third dances.
49 Esquisses by Charles-Valentin Alkan. No. 12, Barcarollette, as compound sextuple meter.

American Song Set by Andrew Violette.

Don Rodrigo by Alberto Ginastera.
4 Etudes, Op. 2, by Sergei Prokofiev. The second étude uses  in one hand against  in the other.
Goldberg Variations, by Johann Sebastian Bach.
5 Klavierstücke, Op. 23 by Arnold Schoenberg, third piece, measures 26 to 30.

Upper number of 19

"33 222 1 222" by Don Ellis. Its title represents the subdivision:

 Piano Sonata No. 2 ("The Airplane"), by George Antheil, for one bar.
"Rusty Cage" by Soundgarden, third section.

"Celestial Terrestrial Commuters" by Mahavishnu Orchestra.
"Home" by Dream Theater, ending.

Upper number between 20 and 29

20
Piano Sonata No. 1 by Charles Wuorinen.
Threni, id est Lamentationes Jeremiae Prophetae, by Igor Stravinsky In "Sensus spei", part 2 of "De Elegia Tertia", bar 4 is in  time.

21

3 Danses from L'Oeuvre d'orgue by Jehan Alain, for one measure in the first dance.
"In Re Con Moto Et Al" by Charles Ives uses .
In the Dead of the Night suite by U.K., "contains an instrumental refrain in ".
 "Keep It Greasy" by Frank Zappa on Joe's Garage (the second verse is in ).

22

 "The First Circle" from the album First Circle by the Pat Metheny Group. Composed by Pat Metheny and Lyle Mays.

24

 American Song Set by Andrew Violette.
 Carmina Burana by Carl Orff has  (written as ) in the movement Veris leta facies.
 Suite in E Minor, HWV 438 by George Frideric Handel uses  for the Gigue.
The Well-Tempered Clavier, Book 1 by Johann Sebastian Bach.

25

 "How's This for Openers?" by Don Ellis.
 "Memory Daydreams Lapses" by OSI.
"Tenemos Roads", by National Health includes "some extremely intricate passages in ".

27

 "Goliath" by Karnivool.

29

Upper number between 30 and 39

30 

 American Song Set by Andrew Violette. One of the songs has  in the piano's right hand against  in the piano's left hand and voice.

31

 Athesie, by The Hirsch Effekt.
 "Fishing Frenzy" from Splatoon 2.

32

33

"Blues in " by Matt Savage.
"Bulgarian Bulge" by Don Ellis.
"In Re Con Moto Et Al" by Charles Ives.

35

36 

 American Song Set by Andrew Violette.
 Organbook by Andrew Violette has .

Upper number between 40 and 49

42

 "Song for Melan and Rafik" by Tigran Hamasyan uses .

43

 Study No. 3a for Player Piano by Conlon Nancarrow uses .

47

 Study No. 3a for Player Piano by Conlon Nancarrow uses .

48 

 American Song Set by Andrew Violette.

Upper number between 50 and 59

53 

Upper number more than 59

256 

Fractional time signatures

Intrada, nebst burlesquer Suite, for two violins (the so-called "Gulliver Suite") by Georg Philipp Telemann.
Lincolnshire Posy by Percy Grainger.
Mädchentotenlieder, by Bo Nilsson.
Bar 83 is in  time.
Bar 97 is in  time.
Bar 123 is in  time.
Bar 112 is in  time.
Le marteau sans maître, by Pierre Boulez. Movement III "L'Artisanat furieux". 
Bar 3 is in  time.
Bars 24, 35, and 43 are in  time.
Piano Sonata No. 2, Concord, Mass., 1840–1860, by Charles Ives. In movement III "The Alcotts", bar 20 is in  time.
Piano Sonata No. 3 by Carlos Chávez.
 Study in Sonority by Wallingford Riegger contains several  bars.
 Study No. 23 by Charles Ives has .

Irrational time signatures 

 Glaubst du an die Unsterblichkeit der Seele?
 I'Itoi Variations by Kyle Gann. Bar 275 is in  time, bar 277 is in  time, and bar 299 is in  time.

Combined unusual signatures

20 Caprices and Rhythmic Studies by Émile Jaques-Dalcroze.
No. 1 has .
No. 2 has .
No. 17 has .
Pli selon pli by Pierre Boulez.
II.
III.
IV.
Structures by Pierre Boulez.

See also

Bulgarian dances
Mathcore
Math rock
Meter (music)
Free time (music)
Progressive rock
Greek dances
Ai Georgis
Kalamatianos
Karsilamas
Tsakonikos
Zeibekiko

Notes and references

Bibliography

 Andriessen, Louis. 1976. De Staat. Hawkes Pocket Scores 1234. London, Paris, Bonn, Johannesburg, Sydney, Tokyo, Toronto, and New York: Boosey & Hawkes.
 Banks, Anthony. n.d. "Firth of Fifth: Introduction". Scribd.com (accessed 22 March 2012).
 Banks, Evan. 2009. "Humming the Bassline: Just Like You Imagined". American Observer: American University's Graduate Journalism Magazine (29 September) (Archive from 3 August 2012, accessed 26 February 2015).
 Barber, Samuel. 1943. String Quartet, Op. 11. G. Schirmer's Edition of Study Scores of Orchestral Works and Chamber Music 28. New York: G. Schirmer.
 Bennett, Matthew. 2014. 65daysofstatic – The Fall of Math. clashmusic.com (accessed 10 March 2020)
 Bernstein, Leonard. 1993. The Age of Anxiety: Symphony No. 2, for piano and orchestra, after W. H. Auden, revised version, full score, corrected edition. [New York]: Jalni Publications, Inc., Boosey & Hawkes.
 Bernstein, Leonard. 1950. Fancy Free: Ballet, corrected edition 1988. N.p.: Jalni Publications, Inc./Boosey & Hawkes.
 Bernstein, Leonard. 1994. Candide: A Comic Operetta in Two Acts, Scottish Opera edition of the opera-house version (1989). Book by Hugh Wheeler, based on the satire by Voltaire; lyrics by Richard Wilbur, with additional lyrics by Stephen Sondheim, John Latouche, Dorothy Parker, Lillian Hellman, and Leonard Bernstein; edited by Charles Harmon. [New York]: Jalni Publications, Inc.; Boosey & Hawkes.
Billmann, Budynek, Jacobson, and Stocker (transcribers). 2010. Jeff Beck – Blow by Blow. Guitar Recorded Versions. Milwaukee: Hal Leonard Corporation. .
 Birtwistle, Harrison. 1996. The Cry of Anubis, for tuba and orchestra. Hawkes Pocket Scores 1292. London: Boosey & Hawkes Music Publishers Limited.
 Blanche, Cate. 2013. "65daysofstatic Wild Light track by track" . Drowned In Sound. 19 September 2013 (accessed 5 February 2020).
 Bois, Rob du. 1979. Concert voor twee violen en orkest. Amsterdam: Donemus.
 Boulez, Pierre. 1957. Le marteau sans maître. Pour voix d'alto et 6 instruments. Poèmes de René Char. Philharmonia Partituren/Scores/Partitions no. 398. Vienna and London: Universal Edition.
 Britten, Benjamin. 1945a. Old Joe Has Gone Fishing. London: Boosey & Hawkes. ISMN 9790060014864
 Britten, Benjamin. 1945b. Passacaglia, opus 33b, from the opera Peter Grimes. London: Boosey & Hawkes.
 Britten, Benjamin. 1946. Quartet No. 2 in C, Op. 36. London: Boosey & Hawkes.
 Britten, Benjamin. 1956. Canticle III (Still Falls the Rain), Op. 55, for tenor, horn, and piano. Words by Edith Sitwell. London, Paris, Bonn, Cape Town, Sydney, Toronto, Buenos Aires, New York: Boosey & Co., Ltd.
 Chatburn, Sean. n.d. Karn Evil 9: 1st Impression, Part 1: Emerson, Lake & Palmer". Jelly Note blog site (accessed 4 October 2016).
 Chávez, Carlos. 1972. Tercera Sonata. Colección Arión, no. 119. México, D.F.: Ediciones Mexicanas de Música.
 Copland, Aaron. 1945. Appalachian Spring (Ballet for Martha). Hawkes Pocket Scores 8. London: Boosey & Hawkes.
 Davies, Peter Maxwell. 1985. Symphony No. 3. Hawkes Pocket Scores 1114. London, Paris, Bonn, Johannesburg, Sydney, Tokyo, Toronto, and New York: Boosey & Hawkes.
 Davison, Archibald T., and Willi Apel (eds.). 1974. Historical Anthology of Music, vol. 1: Oriental, Medieval and Renaissance Music. Revised edition. Cambridge: Harvard University Press. .
 Doe, Paul (ed.). 1988. Elizabethan Consort Music: II. Musica Britannica 45. London: Stainer and Bell, published for the Musica Britannica Trust.
 Fenlon, Sean. 2002. "The Exotic Rhythms of Don Ellis". DMA diss. Baltimore: Johns Hopkins University, Peabody Institute. .
 Fienberg, Gary Andrew. 2004. "It Doesn't Have to Be Sanctified to Swing: A Musical Biography of Don Ellis". PhD diss. Pittsburgh: Carnegie Mellon University. .
 Flans, Robyn. 1982. Untitled interview with Vinnie Colaiuta. Modern Drummer (November).
 Fujita, Tetsuya, Yuji Hagino, Hajime Kubo, and Goro Sato (transcribers). 1993. The Beatles Complete Scores. London: Hal Leonard Publishing Corporation. 
 Gable, Christopher. 2009. The Words and Music of Sting. The Praeger Singer-Songwriter Collection. Westport: Praeger Publishers. .
 Genesis (musical group). 2001. Anthology. Milwaukee: Hal Leonard. .
 Genesis (musical group). 2002. Genesis Guitar Anthology. Hal Leonard Guitar Recorded Version. [United States]: EMI Music Pub.; Milwaukee: Hal Leonard Corporation. .
 Gilmore, Bob. 1994. "Icebreaker". Liner notes to Icebreaker: Terminal Velocity. Argo 443 214–2. CD recording. London: The Decca Record Company Limited.
 Ginastera, Alberto. 1946. 12 American Preludes (Doce Preludios Americanos), 2 vols. New York: Carl Fischer.
 Ginastera, Alberto. 1955. Estancia: Ballet in One Act and Five Scenes. Reduction for piano. Buenos Aires: Barry Editorial, Com., Ind., S. R. L.; [n.p.]: Boosey & Hawkes.
 Ginastera, Alberto. 1969. Don Rodrigo: Opera in Three Acts and Nine Scenes, Op. 31. Vocal Score. London: Boosey& Hawkes Music Publishers Limited.
 Ginastera, Alberto. 1974. Harp Concerto, opus 25. Hawkes Pocket Scores 1185. London: Boosey & Hawkes.
 Grady, Kraig. n.d. "Gending Boehme" liner notes. In An Overview (and History) of Anaphorian Music (accessed 18 April 2015).
 Gutmann, Peter. 2003. "Peter Ilyich Tchaikovsky: Symphony #6 ("Pathetique")" Classical Notes (accessed 2008-03-23).
 Haigh, Chris. n.d. "Fiddling Around the World: Rock Violin". Fiddlingaround.co.uk (accessed 19 August 2013).
 Hansell, Sven, and Carlida Steffan. 2001. "Adolfati, Andrea". The New Grove Dictionary of Music and Musicians, second edition, edited by Stanley Sadie and John Tyrrell. London: Macmillan Publishers.
 Helmore, Rev. Thomas. 1879. "Accent". A Dictionary of Music and Musicians (A.D. 1450–1889) by Eminent Writers, English and Foreign, 2 vols, edited by George Grove, 1:12–18. London: Macmillan.
 Hiley, David. 2001. "Quintuple Metre". The New Grove Dictionary of Music and Musicians, ed. S. Sadie and J. Tyrrell, vol. 20:682–683. London: Macmillan.
 Hocker, Jürgen. n.d. "Conlon Nancarrow: List of Works (English Version)". In Der Komponist Conlon Nancarrow: Leben und Werk eines mexikanischen Einsiedlers, With many English Contributions (accessed 15 July 2013).
 Holst, Gustav. 1977. A Choral Fantasia, Op. 51, edited by Imogen Holst. London, Zürich, Mainz, and New York: Ernst Eulenburg Ltd.
 Howard, Patricia. 1969. The Operas of Benjamin Britten: An Introduction. New York and Washington: Frederick A. Praeger, Publishers.
 Leonard. 2011. "Gojira: The Art of Dying Drum Tab". Songsterr website (22 February) (accessed 14 April 2012). 
 Lloyd Webber, Andrew (music), and Tim Rice (lyrics). 1970. Jesus Christ Superstar, vocal score, selections. New York: Universal—MCA Music Pub.; Miami: Warner Bros. Publications. 
 Lloyd Webber, Andrew (music), and Tim Rice (lyrics). 1979. Evita, vocal score, selections. Melville, N.Y.: Leeds Music Corp—sole selling agent, MCA Music.
 Macan, Edward. 1997. Rocking the Classics: English Progressive Rock and the Counterculture. New York: Oxford University Press. .
 Mawer, Deborah. 2000. "Musical Objects and Machines". In The Cambridge Companion to Ravel, edited by Deborah Mawer, 47–70. Cambridge: Cambridge University Press.  (cloth)  (pbk)
 
 Nancarrow, Conlon. n.d. [Study] No. 40 (autograph punching score). In Der Komponist Conlon Nancarrow: Leben und Werk eines mexikanischen Einsiedlers, With many English Contributions, edited by Jürgen Hocker (Accessed 15 July 2013).
 Nice, David. 2003. Prokofiev: From Russia to the West, 1891–1935. New Haven and London: Yale University Press. * Page, Nick. 1989. Niska Banja: Serbian Gypsy Dance, arranged for SATB choir. Doreen Rao's Building Bridges. Common Roots Choral Music. London: Boosey & Hawkes.
 
 Perkins, Wayne L. 2000. "Don Ellis' Use of "New Rhythms" in His Compositions : The Great Divide (1969), Final Analysis (1969) and Strawberry Soup (1971)" (vol. 1); "Original Compositions: She's Only 19 (1999), Malibu Shuffle (1999) and Cruisin' P.C.H. (1999)" (vol. 2). Ph.D. diss. Los Angeles: University of California Los Angeles.
 Pöhlmann, Egert, and Martin L. West. 2001. Documents of Ancient Greek Music: The Extant Melodies and Fragments Edited and Transcribed with Commentary. Oxford: Clarendon Press. 
 
 Pope, Isabel, and Tess Knighton. 2001. "Fernández, Diego". The New Grove Dictionary of Music and Musicians, ed. S. Sadie and J. Tyrrell. London: Macmillan.
 Portnoy, Mike, Robert Wallis, and Paul Siegel. 1999. Mike Portnoy: Liquid Drum Theater. 2 vols. Reissued on DVD, Color, Dolby, DVD, NTSC. 2-DVD set. Hudson Music HD-Z-LV01. [N.p.]: Hudson Music, 2001. .
 Read, Gardner. 1964. Music Notation: A Manual of Modern Practice. Boston: Alleyn and Bacon, Inc.
 Revueltas, Silvestre. 1971. Alcancías for Small Orchestra (score). New York: Southern Music Publishing Company, Inc.; Hamburg: Peer Musikverlag G.M.B.H.
 
 Richards, Paul. 1987. "Africa in the Music of Samuel Coleridge-Taylor". Africa: Journal of the International African Institute 57, no. 4 ("Sierra Leone, 1787–1987"): 566–71.
 Shostakovich, Dmitri. 1983. Sobranie sochinenii tom 13 [Собрание сочинений том 13, Collected works volume 13], Izdatelstvo "Muzyka" Moskva.
 Stevenson, Seth. 2014. "What Is the Time Signature of the Ominous Electronic Score of The Terminator? A Slate Investigation". Slate.com (26 February) (accessed 27 February 2014).
 Stockhausen, Karlheinz. 1967. Nr. 4: Klavierstück IX. London: Universal Edition. (UE 13675e)
 Strait, Thomas John. 2000. "The Rhythmic Innovations of Don Ellis: An Examination of Their Origins as Found in His Early Works". DMA diss. Greeley: University of Northern Colorado. 
 Tye, Christopher. 1967. The Instrumental Music, edited by Robert W. Weidner. Recent Researches in the Music of the Renaissance 3. New Haven: A-R Editions.
 Wagner, Jeff. 2010. Mean Deviation. Brooklyn: Bazillion Points. .
 Waugh, Ian. 2003. "Ten Minute Master No. 6: Time Signatures". Music Tech Magazine (May): 76–77.
 Wiehmayer, Theodor. 1917. Musikalische Rhythmik und Metrik. Magdeburg: Heinrichshofen's Verlag.
 Wolinkski, Paul. 2014. "65daysofstatic – The Fall of Math: ten years later with Paul Wolinski". Thrash Hits. 26 March 2014 (accessed 5 February 2020).
 Zohn, Steven. 2004. "The Sonate auf Concertenart and Conceptions of Genre in the Late Baroque". Eighteenth-Century Music 1, no. 2:205–47.

Unusual time signatures
Unusual time signature
Musical works in unusual time signatures
 Unusual